Magazine Luiza is a Brazilian retail company, along with GPA, Viavarejo, Lojas Americanas and others. The current chairperson is Luiza Trajano and the current CEO is her son Frederico Trajano.

History 
In 1992, Magalu launched its first “virtual” stores, which at the time were physical retail outlets equipped with multimedia ordering kiosks, which were still in use in 2019.

In January 2016, Frederico Trajano became Magazine Luiza's CEO.

In August 2020, the company acquired Hubsales, a website selling products directly to consumers, Canaltech, a gadget review website, and InLoco Media an advertising company using mobile phone location tracking data.

In November 2020, it was announced that the trainee program would only accept Black Brazilians in order to confront structural racism, in which Black Brazilians are often sidelined.

References

Retail companies established in 1957
1957 establishments in Brazil
Retail companies of Brazil
Companies based in São Paulo (state)
Department stores of Brazil
Companies listed on B3 (stock exchange)
Brazilian brands